Carlos Méndez may refer to:

 Carlos Méndez (judoka) (born 1972), Puerto Rican judoka
 Carlos Alberto Méndez Castillo (born 1974), Venezuelan baseball player
 Carlos Johnny Méndez, member of the House of Representatives of Puerto Rico
 Carlos Méndez Martínez, mayor of Aguadilla, Puerto Rico